Two ships of the Royal Navy have borne the name HMS Abigail:

  was a 4-gun fireship purchased in 1666 and expended later that year.

Royal Navy ship names